Fujiwara no Ikushi (藤原 育子; 1146 – September 23, 1173) was an Empress consort of Japan. She was the consort of Emperor Nijō of Japan and foster mother of Emperor Rokujō.

In the same year of Emperor Rokujō's abdication, Fujiwara took tonsure as a Buddhist nun.

Notes

Fujiwara clan
Tokudaiji family
Japanese empresses
Japanese Buddhist nuns
12th-century Buddhist nuns
1146 births
1173 deaths